IRM is the third studio album by French electropop singer Charlotte Gainsbourg, with all songs written and produced by Beck except "Le Chat Du Café Des Artistes" (written by Jean-Pierre Ferland). The album title was inspired by the French initialism for an MRI scanner. The title track was released as a free download on 9 October 2009. The album was mostly recorded at Beck's home studio in Los Angeles, California. The lead single is "Heaven Can Wait", a duet with Beck, and was released on 2 November. The music video for "Heaven Can Wait" was directed by Keith Schofield and was released on 19 November 2009. The video for "Heaven Can Wait" was named one of the Top 20 best music videos of 2009 by Spin Magazine. "Trick Pony" is featured in the football video game by EA Sports, FIFA 11.

According to Gainsbourg, IRM "was Beck’s view of what I had gone through, and not mine."

In 2012 it was awarded a diamond certification from the Independent Music Companies Association which indicated sales of at least 200,000 copies throughout Europe.

Reception

The album currently has a Metacritic score of 80/100 based on 21 professional reviews, indicating "generally favorable reviews".

Track listing

String arrangements by David Campbell (tracks 1, 3, 7, 8, 11, 12, 13)

Bonus tracks

Charts

Release history

Sunset Sound EP
On 13 April 2010, Gainsbourg released a five-track EP called Sunset Sound EP, which contains four songs from IRM recorded live at Sunset Sound Recorders with Beck Hansen.

Promotional tour
To promote IRM, Gainsbourg embarked on her first live tour by performing at several venues, music festivals and television shows in North America, Europe and Asia.
 9 December 2009 – Taratata on France 2
 10 December 2009 – Le Grand Journal on Canal+
 11 December 2009 – Taratata on France 4
 19 January 2010 – The Bell House, Gowanus, Brooklyn
 20 January 2010 – The Bell House
 22 January 2010 – Theater of Living Arts, Philadelphia
 22 January 2010 – Late Show with David Letterman
 23 January 2010 – Exclusive concert and interview for Canal+ (France)
 23 January 2010 – The Hiro Ballroom, New York City
 28 January 2010 – Morning Becomes Eclectic on KCRW
 11 April 2010 – Vogue Theatre, Vancouver
 12 April 2010 – Elemental Night Club, Victoria, British Columbia
 14 April 2010 - Live performance on KEXP-FM
 14 April 2010 – Crocodile Cafe, Seattle
 15 April 2010 – Wonder Ballroom, Portland, Oregon
 17 April 2010 – Palace of Fine Arts, San Francisco
 18 April 2010 – Coachella Festival, Indio, California
 21 April 2010 – Park West, Chicago
 23 April 2010 – Olympia, Montreal
 24 April 2010 – Olympia, Montreal
 25 April 2010 – Webster Hall, New York City
 14 June 2010 – Le Cargo, Caen
 15 June 2010 - La Coopé, Clermont-Ferrand
 16 June 2010 - La Cigale, Paris
 19 June 2010 - Cirque Royal, Brussels
 20 June 2010 - Aeronet, Lille
 22 June 2010 - O2 Shepherd's Bush Empire, London
 24 June 2010 -Les Nuits de Fourvière, Lyon
 27 June 2010 - Deutsches Schauspielhaus, Hamburg
 28 June 2010 - Volksbühne, Berlin
 29 June 2010 - Malta Festival, Poznań
 2 July 2010 - Eurockéennes, Belfort
 3 July 2010 - Den Atelier, Luxembourg City
 4 July 2010 - Montreux Jazz Festival, Montreux
 8 July 2010 - La Cigale, Paris
 9 July 2010 - La Cigale, Paris
 10 July 2010 - Les Ardentes, Liège
 13 July 2010 - Théâtre J Deschamps, Carcassonne
 14 July 2010 - Traffic Festival, Turin
 15 July 2010 - Festival Internacional de Benicàssim, Benicàssim
 16 July 2010 - Les Francofolies de La Rochelle, La Rochelle
 18 July 2010 - Latitude Festival, Southwold
 24 October 2010 - Tokyo International Forum, Tokyo
 26 October 2010 - IMP Hall, Osaka

References

External links
 Official site
 Charlotte Gainsbourg – IRM (CD, Album) at Discogs

Charlotte Gainsbourg albums
2009 albums
Because Music albums
Albums arranged by David Campbell (composer)
Albums produced by Beck
Albums recorded in a home studio